Eero Aarne Pekka Tarasti (born 27 September 1948 in Helsinki), is a Finnish musicologist and semiologist, currently serving as Professor Emeritus of Musicology at the University of Helsinki.

He received his Ph.D. degree at the University of Helsinki in 1978, writing his dissertation Myth and Music on Richard Wagner, Jean Sibelius, and Igor Stravinsky. Then, Tarasti served at the University of Jyväskylä between 1979–1984, where he was appointed Professor of Arts Education in 1979 and Professor of Musicology in 1983. In 1984 he took the position of Professor of Musicology in Helsinki, succeeding Erik Tawaststjerna. Tarasti has held posts as Director or President in several semiotic and musical societies and since the 1970s has written and edited numerous books encompassing a semiotic approach to music. He has been the President of the International Association for Semiotic Studies (2004–2014), and the Director of the International Semiotics Institute.

Eero Tarasti is married to Eila Marita Elisabet Tarasti, pianist and musicologist

Education

Finland
Eero Tarasti went to school at Helsinki Normal Lyceum, the classical line, where he became baccalaureat in 1967 (with six laudaturs): Then he studied at the University of Helsinki 1967–1975, first theoretical philosophy, then sociology and aesthetics and, at the end, musicology.
He got his Ph.D. at the University of Helsinki 1978 with the thesis entitled Myth and Music (published in 1979 by Mouton de Gruyter, Berlin). At the same time he enrolled at
music studies (piano) at the Sibelius Academy, Helsinki 1967–1975. Among his piano teachers were Liisa Pohjola, Timo Mikkilä and Tapani Valsta. Earlier he had studied privately piano with Kaisa Arjava.

Studies abroad
He pursued music studies in Vienna 1972 with Noel Flores and then in Paris 1973 with Jules Gentil (École Normale de Musique), with Jacques Février 1974-75: he continued his music studies in Rio de Janeiro with Heitor Alimonda (1976) and then in the US with Walter Robert and Joseph Rezits in Bloomington (1987); in Helsinki he followed pianopedagogical course by professor Gunnar Hallhagen, and private course by Jan Hoffmann.
He got the grant of French Government for doctoral studies in Paris, in 1974-75 (Ecole des Hautes Etudes en Sciences Sociales, professor A.J. Greimas as his supervisor); he also followed teaching at Collège de France, and met a.o. Claude Lévi-Strauss and Roland Barthes. In Rio de Janeiro 1976 (Universidade Federal) he pursued anthropological studies as an awardee of Rotary International.

Career
His first chair was at Arts Education, University of Jyväskylä (Middle Finland) 1979–83; then he served there one year as professor of Musicology, 1983–84 and was nominated as Professor of Musicology at the University of Helsinki, 1984–2016. He continues there his teaching as an emeritus professor.

Other Academic Activities:

He was elected President of the IASS/AIS (International Association for Semiotic Studies), for two periods in 2004–2014, and before he had already been two periods as its Vice-President in 1990–2004; moreover he has been Founder and President of the Semiotic Society of Finland, since 1979. When the International Semiotics Institute was founded in Imatra, Finland (ISI) upon initiative of Prof. Thomas A. Sebeok (Indiana University, Bloomington) he was elected its first President in 1988. He chaired it until 2013 when the institute was moved to Kaunas Technological University, Lithuania.

In musical field he is the Founder and President of the Music Society of University of Helsinki, since 1989; In 1986 an international research project Musical Signification was established at French Broadcast company in 1986 - since then Eero Tarasti has been its director.
He was also Director of the Finnish Network University of Semiotics, 2004-2013 (funded by the EU); he worked as Research director (part-time) at the University of Lapland, Rovaniemi (2008-2014) for founding the pan-European doctoral program in semiotics, SEMKNOW. He is also
Founder and President of the Academy of Cultural Heritages (ACU) since 2016.

Abroad:

Eero Tarasti has had many nominations for foreign universities. Among them we can count: Fellow of the Japan Foundation 1991;Fellow of the Advanced Studies Institute at the Indiana University, Bloomington in 1993; Research Associate at the RCLSS (Research Center for Language and Semiotic Studies, IU; Bloomington) in 1987 and 1994;Visiting Professor at the University of Paris I, Sorbonne in the Spring of 1995; 
Visiting Professor at the University of Tartu, Estonia, 1997–98;Visiting Professor at the University of Minnesota, Minneapolis, 1999;Visiting Professor at the University of Paris VIII, 2002; Visiting Professor at the University of Aix en Provence, 2002;Poste d’accueil pour recherche par CNRS/Université de Paris I (Pantheon-Sorbonne), 2008;

Moreover, he was Membre du Conseil Scientifique & Ecole Doctorale Arts Plastiques, esthétique et sciences de l'art, Université de Paris I-Panthéon Sorbonne, in 1998–2012; In addition he has served as Member of the Board at Istituto Superiore Scienze Umane (directed by Umberto Eco),
Bologna, since 2005.

Eero Tarasti has guest lectured in almost all the European Countries, Russia, Kazakhstan, Iran, United States, Mexico, Brazil, Argentina, Chile, Peru, Japan and China.

He has organized over 80 international symposia and congresses in Finland and abroad;
he has supervised and attended defences of 107 doctoral theses in Finland and abroad

Memberships 
He was member of the Executive Committee of the IASS/AIS (International Association
for Semiotic Studies) in 1979–2000; Member of the Academia Europaea since 1987;
Member of the Academy of Informatization, Moscow since 1994; Member of the Board of the South-Eastern European Semiotic Center, Bulgaria, since 2000; Member of the Grant Selection Committee for the International Kyoto Prize, Japan, 1996; Member of the Wihuri Foundation International Prize Committee 2000,2003, 2005, 2009 and 2015. He was President of the Finnish Musicological Society 1995-98 and President of the Finnish Society for Aesthetic 1986–87; he is Member of the Finnish Science Society since 1998 and Member of the Scientific Academy of Finland since 1990

He is Member of the Board of Niilo Helander Foundation; he was Member of the Board of Pro Musica Foundation 1984–2010; Member of the Board of Promotion of Finnish Art Music Foundation 1984–1997; Member of the Council for Arts Education by the Finnish Parliament, 2011- Member of the Cultural Board of Southern Savo Region, Finland, 2011-

In the publishing field he is active in the following journals and academic series: he is
Member of the International Editorial Board of "Seemiootikee", Sign Systems Studies,
University of Tartu; Member of the International Editorial Board of the Journal "DeSignis" (Publicacion de la Federación Latinoamericana de Semiótica);Member of the International Editorial Board of the Journal ’Signa’ (Spanish Society of Semiotics); Member of the Editorial Board of Interdisciplinary Studies in Musicology (Poznan);Member of the Editorial Board of “Lithuanian musicology”; Member of the Advisory Board of TRANS (electronic journal on musicology and ethnomusicology, Barcelona); Member of the Advisory Panel of “Musica Humana”, Journal of Korean Institute of Musicology; Member of the Advisory Board of “Perspectiva Interdisciplinaria de Musica”, UNAM, Mexico; Member of the Honorary Committee of LEXIA, Journal of Semiotics, Turin, Italy; Member of the Editorial Board of Jean Sibelius Gesamtausgabe; Chief Advisor of the Chinese Semiotic Studies, Nanjing Normal University Press; Member of the Editorial Board of Revista EIMAS (Encontro Internacional de Música e Arte Sonora), Universidade Federal de Juiz de Fora, Brasil (from 2011 on); Member of the Scientific committee of the publishing series Théories et critiques, at L’Harmattan, Paris, since 2011; Member of the Board of Journal of Chongqing Jiaotong University, since 2015;
Member of the Editorial Board of Advisers at Central Asian Journal of Art Studies, Kazak National University of Al Farabi, Almaty, Kazakhstan, since 2015

Media
"Sémiotique et musicologie - Eero Tarasti", a film about the life and work of
Eero Tarasti, in French and English (4 hours), produced by Maison des Sciences de 
L'Homme, by professor Peter Stockinger, Paris, 2004, in the collection "Entretiens. Les archives de la recherche en sciences humaines et sociales" (available also at internet: http://arquivo.pt/wayback/20141126071357/http%3A//www.fmsh.fr/)

Honors
Eero Tarasti has received several international honours as follows: 
 Honorary Doctor of Humane Letters, Indiana University, Bloomington, 1997;
 Honorary Doctor of the Estonian Music Academy, 1999; 
 Honorary Doctor of the New Bulgarian University, Sofia, 2001
 Honorary Doctor at Université Aix-Marseille, 2014
 Honorary Doctor at “Georghe Dima” Music Academy, Cluj-Napoca, Rumania, 2016
He is also Honorary Fellow of the Victoria College, University of Toronto; Fellow of the International Communicology Institute, Washington D.C. ,USA, 2010
In Finland he got the J.V.Snellman Prize of the University of Helsinki 1997 and the Science Prize of the City of Helsinki, 1998; he is Honorary Member of the Richard Wagner Society in Finland 2008

He has been decorated by the 1st Class Medal of the White Rose Order of Finland 1999
The Medal of the Order of Rio Branco, Brazil (the category of Officials) 2000, and by
Chevalier de l’Ordre Palme Académique, France, 2004

Publications (books only)
 Myth and Music. A Semiotic Approach to the Aesthetics of Myth in Music, especially that of Wagner, Sibelius and Stravinsky 1979 (Berlin: Mouton; in Finnish 1994; in French Mythe et musique, Michel de Maule 2003)
 Heitor Villa-Lobos 1996 (North Carolina: McFarland; in Finnish 1987)
 A Theory of Musical Semiotics (Bloomington: Indiana University Press, 1994)
 Musical Signification (ed.) (Berlin: Mouton) 1995
 Semiotics of Music (ed.) 1987 (Semiotica)
 Semiotics of Finland (ed.) 1991 (Semiotica)  
 La musique comme language I-II (ed.) 1987-88 (Degres)  
 Sémiologie et pratiques esthetiques (ed.) 1991 (Degres)
 Center and Periphery (ed. Acta Semiotica Fennica ASF) 1990  
 On the Borderlines of Semiosis (ed. ASF) 1992  
 Introduction to Semiotics (in Finnish) 1990
 The Dream and Exaltation of Romanticism (in Finnish) 1992  
 Le secret du professeur Amfortas (novel, in French, Paris: L'Harmattan) 2000  
 Musical Semiotics in Growth (ed. ASF/IU Press) 1996  
 La sémiotique musicale (Presses Universitaires de Limoges) 1996  
 Examples (in Finnish) 1996  
 Semiotics of Music (ed. in electronic journal Applied Semiotics, Toronto, Canada); Heroes of Music (in Finnish)
 1988; Snow, Forest, Silence. The Finnish Tradition of Semiotics (ed.) 1998
 The Correspondence (of the School Years and Years of Formation) between E.T. and Hannu Riikonen 1961-76 (in Finnish) 1998  
 Musical Signification: Between Rhetoric and Pragmatics (ed. together with Gino Stefani and Luca Marconi), (CLUEB, Bologna) 1998
 Existential Semiotics (Bloomington: Indiana University Press) 2000  
 Signs of Music (Berlin: Walter de Gruyter) 2002  
 The Realities of Music. An Encyclopedia (in Finnish)(Helsinki University Press, 2003) 
 Values and Signs (in Finnish)(Helsinki: Gaudeamus) 2004 
 Portraits – Interpretations, Reminiscences, Stories (in Finnish, Imatra: ISI), 2006 
 La musique et ses signes (Paris: L’Harmattan) 2006 
 Music and the Arts I-II, (Imatra, Acta semiotica fennica), 2006 
 Maamme Suomi (Our Land Finland), ed. together with A. Tiitta, J. Nummi and R. Stewen, Helsinki: Weilin et Göös, 2007 
 Fondamenti di semiotica esistenziale (transl. by M. Berruti), Bari-Roma: Laterza Editore, 2009 
 Fondements de la sémiotique existentielle (traduction par Jean-Laurent Csinidis), Paris: L’Harmattan 2009 
 Existenzialnaja semiotika (in Bulgarian, transl. by Ivaylo Krastev, Kristian Bankov), Sofia: New Bulgarian University 2009 
 Communication – Understanding/Misunderstanding. Proceedings from the 9th World Congress of IASS/AIS (ed.) I-III, Imatra: Acta semiotica fennica, 2009 
 I segni della musica. Che cosa ci dicono i suoni, Milano: Ricordi/LIM, 2010 
 Foundations of Existential Semiotics 2012 (the Chinese edition by Sichuan University Press) 
 Semiotics of Classical Music: How Mozart, Brahms and Wagner Talk To Us 2012, Berlin: Mouton de Gruyter 
 Music and Humanism. Essays 2003-2013 (in Finnish), Joensuu: University Press of Eastern Finland, 2013 
 Retour à la Villa Nevski (roman) Paris: Editions Impliquées 2014 
 L’eredità di Villa Nevski (romanzo), Lanciano: Casa Editrice Rocco Carabba, 2014 
 Sein und Schein. Explorations in Existential Semiotics. 2015 (New York: Mouton de Gruyter 
 Eurooppa/Ehkä (Europe/Perhaps), (a novel, in Finnish), 2016 Jyväskylä: Athanor 
 Sémiotique de la musique classique, 2016, Aix en Provence : Presses Universitaires de Provence.
 published about 400 articles in many languages about semiotics, musical semiotics, music theory, history, aesthetic and analysis.

Publishers:
 Gaudeamus, Helsinki
 Helsinki University Press
 Indiana University Press
 Laterza Editore, Bari-Roma
 McFarland, North Carolina
 Mouton de Gruyter, Berlin
 New Bulgarian University, Sofia
 Presses Universitaire de Limoges
 L'Harmattan, Paris
 Werner Söderström, Helsinki
 Michel de Maule, Paris
 Ricordi, Milano
 LIM, Lucca
 Sichuan University Press
 University Press of Eastern Finland
 Editions Impliquées, Paris
 Casa Editrice Rocco Carabba, Lanciano
 Athanor, Jyväskylä, Finland
 Presses Universitaires de Provence

References

External links
 Eero Tarasti in 375 humanists. 28 April 2015. University of Helsinki.
 Tarasti, Eero 2017. The semiotics of A. J. Greimas: A European intellectual heritage seen from the inside and the outside. Sign Systems Studies 45(1/2): 33–53.

Semioticians
Finnish musicologists
Academic staff of the University of Helsinki
1948 births
Living people
University of Helsinki alumni
20th-century Finnish musicians
20th-century Finnish educators
21st-century Finnish musicians
21st-century Finnish educators
Presidents of the International Association for Semiotic Studies